Abdullah Hassoun Tarmin (born 19 March 1997) is a Saudi Arabian footballer who plays as a right-back for Damac.

Career statistics

Club

References

External links
 
 
 
 

1997 births
Living people
Saudi Arabian footballers
Association football fullbacks
Saudi Professional League players
Al-Ahli Saudi FC players
Al-Tai FC players
Damac FC players
Saudi Arabia youth international footballers
Saudi Arabia international footballers
Sportspeople from Jeddah
Olympic footballers of Saudi Arabia
Footballers at the 2020 Summer Olympics